The 1965 World Table Tennis Championships – Swaythling Cup (men's team) was the 28th edition of the men's team championship.  

China won the gold medal defeating Japan 5–2 in the final. North Korea won the bronze medal after defeating Yugoslavia in the third place play off.

Medalists

Team

Swaythling Cup tables

Semifinal round

Group 1

Group 2

Third-place playoff

Final

See also
List of World Table Tennis Championships medalists

References

-